The women's doubles tennis event of the 2019 Pan American Games was held from July 30 through August 3 at the Club Lawn Tennis de La Exposcicion in Lima, Peru.

Usue Aroncada and Caroline Dolehide of the United States won the gold medal, defeating Verónica Cepede Royg and Montserrat González of Paraguay in the final, 6–0, 6–4.

Carolina Alves and Luisa Stefani of Brazil won the bronze medal, defeating Alexa Guarachi and Daniela Seguel of Chile in the Bronze-medal match, 2–6, 7–5, [11–9].

Seeds

Draw

Draw

References
 Draw

Women's Doubles